Shorthand Phonetics is an indie rock and film score outfit from Bandung, Indonesia which, as of 2013, only comprises Ababil Ashari (vocals, guitars, bass and programming). The outfit was established on 13 April 2004, although conflicting reports claims that the band has been releasing material since 2003. The outfit has been releasing music for Yogyakarta, Indonesia netlabel Yes No Wave Music since 2007.

Shorthand Phonetics used to be a five-piece full band comprising Ababil Ashari, Alfonsus Tanoto (bass), Daniel Sastro (guitar), Kevin Yapsir (guitar) and Alvin Lasmana (drums). This line up produced the first Shorthand Phonetics album, Fanfiction: From the Seriously Absurd to the Absurdly Serious (2006). After the release of this album however, the rest of the band members left to pursue academic degrees outside Indonesia, more specifically America and Singapore. This left Ababil to continue the namesake as a songwriting/recording outfit.

The Shorthand Phonetics recorded sound is a mix of staccato guitars, melodic strumming, frenetic drumming, and basic bass lines with loose vocals,  that talk about mundane annoyances of life, produced in a lo-fi manner using webcam microphones and a laptop.

The outfit has topped the  Jakarta Globe's list for the "Top 5 Indonesian Albums of ’09" for the film score album Score No. 1 (Dream:Chase) in A major, Op. 17 for Three Electric Guitars, One Bass Guitar and One Drum Kit.

The outfit's latest release, Cantata no. 6 (Assistants of Assistants) in Varying Keys, Op. 25 for Three Electric Guitars, One Bass Guitar, One Drum Kit, One Tenor and Additional Voices Where Appropriate was released on 10 August 2011.

In 2014, Shorthand Phonetics moved to Jakarta, Indonesia and gained two new permanent members in Dylan Amirio (bass, vox) and Garbanu Priduarja (drums, vox). This line-up lasted one year before Shorthand Phonetics disbanded in 2015.

Discography

Albums

Film scores

References

Indonesian rock music groups